Hadelandshøgda  is a mountain on the border of Viken and Oslo, in southern Norway.

Mountains of Viken
Mountains of Oslo